Ensemble Scolaire Le Bon Sauveur is a private school in Le Vésinet, Yvelines, France, in the Paris metropolitan area. It serves levels maternelle (preschool) through lycée (high school).

It was established after 1928, when the Congregation of the Girls of Le Bon Sauveur of Caen received permission to establish a private catholic school for girls. In 1977 the establishment became secular and open to boys.

References

External links
 Ensemble scolaire Le Bon Sauveur 

Lycées in Yvelines
Schools in Yvelines
Private schools in France
Secondary schools in France